The 2014–15 Biathlon World Cup – World Cup 9 was held in Khanty-Mansiysk, Russia, from 19 March until 22 March 2015.

Schedule of events

Medal winners

Men

Women

References 

9
2015 in Russian sport
March 2015 sports events in Russia
World Cup - World Cup 9,2014-15
Sport in Khanty-Mansiysk